The Davidon–Fletcher–Powell formula (or DFP; named after William C. Davidon, Roger Fletcher, and Michael J. D. Powell) finds the solution to the secant equation that is closest to the current estimate and satisfies the curvature condition. It was the first quasi-Newton method to generalize the secant method to a multidimensional problem. This update maintains the symmetry and positive definiteness of the Hessian matrix.

Given a function , its gradient, and positive-definite Hessian matrix , the Taylor series is

and the Taylor series of the gradient itself (secant equation)

is used to update .  

The DFP formula finds a solution that is symmetric, positive-definite and closest to the current approximate value of :

where

The corresponding update to the inverse Hessian approximation  is given by

 is assumed to be positive-definite, and the vectors  and  must satisfy the curvature condition

 

The DFP formula is quite effective, but it was soon superseded by the Broyden–Fletcher–Goldfarb–Shanno formula, which is its dual (interchanging the roles of y and s).

See also
 Newton's method
 Newton's method in optimization
 Quasi-Newton method
 Broyden–Fletcher–Goldfarb–Shanno (BFGS) method
 Limited-memory BFGS method
 Symmetric rank-one formula
 Nelder–Mead method

References

Further reading
 
 
  
 
 

Optimization algorithms and methods